Piskorczyn  is a village in the administrative district of Gmina Brzuze, within Rypin County, Kuyavian-Pomeranian Voivodeship, in north-central Poland. The village has population of 128.

Demography

References

Piskorczyn